Margaret Gascoigne (née Percy) (born c. 1447) was an English noblewoman, the daughter of Henry Percy, 3rd Earl of Northumberland and Eleanor Poynings.

Family
She married Sir William Gascoigne (V) (c. 1450 – 1486), son of Sir William Gascoigne (IV) (c. 1427 – c. 1463) and Joan Neville (c. 1436–1464).
The couple had the following children:
Sir William Gascoigne VI: married firstly Alice Frognall and secondly Margaret Neville, daughter of Richard Neville, 2nd Baron Latimer of Snape. Had issue by both marriages.
Elizabeth (1470–1559): married before April 1493 as his second wife Sir George Tailboys (c. 1467 – 1538), de jure 9th Baron Kyme and Sheriff of Lincolnshire.
Anne or Agnes (c. 1474 – 1504): married firstly Sir Thomas Fairfax (c. 1475 – 1520). She had twin sons: Nicholas and William. Married secondly Ralph Neville, of Thornton Bridge.
Dorothy (c. 1475 – 1527): married Sir Ninian Markenfield (died 1527).
Margaret (d. July 1515): married Ralph Ogle, 3rd Baron Ogle (7 November 1468 – 16 January 1512/1513).

Ancestry

Notes

1440s births
Year of death unknown
Daughters of British earls
15th-century English people
15th-century English women
Margaret